Nathan Jacobson (October 5, 1910 – December 5, 1999) was an American mathematician.

Biography
Born Nachman Arbiser in Warsaw, Jacobson emigrated to America with his family in 1918. He graduated from the University of Alabama in 1930 and was awarded a doctorate in mathematics from Princeton University in 1934. While working on his thesis, Non-commutative polynomials and cyclic algebras, he was advised by Joseph Wedderburn.

Jacobson taught and researched at Bryn Mawr College (1935–1936), the University of Chicago (1936–1937), the University of North Carolina at Chapel Hill (1937–1943), and Johns Hopkins University (1943–1947) before joining Yale University in 1947. He remained at Yale until his retirement.

He was a member of the National Academy of Sciences and the American Academy of Arts and Sciences. He served as president of the American Mathematical Society from 1971 to 1973, and was awarded their highest honour, the Leroy P. Steele prize for lifetime achievement, in 1998. He was also vice-president of the International Mathematical Union from 1972 to 1974.

Selected works

Books
Collected Mathematical Papers, 3 vols., 1989
The theory of Rings. 1943
Lectures in Abstract Algebra.  3 vols., Van Nostrand 1951, 1953, 1964, Reprint by Springer 1975 (Vol.1 Basic concepts, Vol.2 Linear Algebra, Vol.3 Theory of fields and Galois theory)
Structure of Rings. AMS 1956
Lie Algebras. Interscience 1962
Structure and Representations of Jordan Algebras. AMS 1968
Exceptional Lie Algebras. Dekker 1971
Basic Algebra. Freeman, San Francisco 1974, Vol. 1; 1980, Vol. 2;  
PI-Algebras. An Introduction. Springer 1975
Finite-dimensional division algebras over fields 1996

Articles

with F. D. Jacobson: 

with C. E. Rickart: 

with C. E. Rickart:

See also
Jacobson–Bourbaki theorem
Jacobson's conjecture
Jacobson density theorem
Jacobson radical
Jacobson ring

References

External links

 
 
 An interview with William L. Duren, Nathan Jacobson, and Edward J. McShane about their experiences at Princeton

1910 births
Members of the United States National Academy of Sciences
1999 deaths
Polish emigrants to the United States
20th-century American mathematicians
Algebraists
University of Alabama alumni
Princeton University alumni
Bryn Mawr College faculty
University of North Carolina at Chapel Hill faculty
Johns Hopkins University faculty
Yale University faculty
Presidents of the American Mathematical Society